Bruno Kurz (born 1957 in Langenargen at Lake Constance) is a German painter. He primarily works on reflective surfaces such as metal, creating paintings of great luminosity and depth – expansive colour fields with vague allusions to landscape. Apart from painting, his work comprises large art installations fashioned through light.

Biography 
Bruno Kurz spent his childhood in Kressbronn am Bodensee (Lake Constance). He is the oldest son of Rupert Kurz (born 1933), a metal worker, and his late wife Gertrud Kurz (1934–2007). During his secondary education at the Knaben-Realschule (all-boys secondary modern)
Lindau, Bruno Kurz was introduced to oil painting by his mathematics teacher. After finishing his Abitur (German university entrance qualification) at the Technisches Gymnasium (comparable to grammar school) Friedrichshafen, he started an engineering degree, which was disrupted by being called up for Zivildienst (compulsory paid community work as alternative to military service). Subsequently, he did a year's travel, going by ship to Israel and Rhodes, where he created his first group of paintings and finally decided to study painting. After his return, Kurz studied at the Freie Kunstschule (Free Art School) Stuttgart under :de:Gerd Neisser (1980–81) and at the :de:Staatliche Akademie der Bildenden Künste Karlsruhe (Karlsruhe Academy of Fine Arts) under Per Kirkeby and :de:Max G. Kaminski (1981–86).

Bruno Kurz has been concerned with particular aspects of light and colour since his youth. While still studying, he undertook extensive travels to Southern Europe and India (1983/84 and 1986/87), later to Mexico and Canada. The experience of nature and new realms of colour and light led to numerous experiments with painting surfaces and colour substances, and major work cycles evolved. A project grant on the theme of "Heimat" enabled his first journey to Northern Europe in 1998, where he visited the Outer Hebrides, the Oakland Islands, the Scottish Highlands and Bergen in Norway. Celtic symbols and their typical merging of circle and cross, Irish-Scottish monasticism and its connections with the Lake Constance region, together with impressions of nature formed the basis for a large project-related exhibition in his home town Kressbronn am Bodensee, featuring expansive installations. From 2000 onwards, such experiences of landscape effected a new series of pictures: Over ten years, he worked on his Hebrides Cycle, where, for the first time, the horizontal layers of delicate colour fields emerged that characterise his work; they would become a core aspect of his future painting practice. Since 2013, the artist has frequently travelled to Iceland and Greenland.

"What's important is, that an artist just like our 20th century Canadian painters, goes north in search of the light and in search of interesting themes. Everyone knows that the northern artists went south for discovering the light. The best example of that is Provence. But here we have an artist who goes north because the light is just as beautiful, strong and pure. So Bruno Kurz comes along in the depths of winter and goes round the Hebrides in his kayak and is impressed by what he sees. Without any photos, of course, he goes back to his studio, and paints with a good distance, this distance that is so important for painters so they are not overwhelmed by nature, but have had time and space to absorb and process it."

Bruno Kurz lives and works in Karlsruhe. He shows his work in one-person and group exhibitions in galleries in Germany, Canada and Switzerland and has solo presentations at international art fairs such as Art Toronto, Art Zuerich or Art Cologne.

Awards 
 1986 Project grant, Stiftung Kunstfonds (Art Funds Trust) Bonn
 1988–1989 Bursary Kunststiftung (Arts Foundation) Baden-Württemberg
 1992–1993 Postgraduate studies: Interdisciplinary Media, Staatliche Akademie der Bildenden Künste Stuttgart (Stuttgart Academy of Fine Arts)
 1998 Travel bursary to Northern Europe for the project Heimat
 2006 Project grant, Kunst- und Kulturstiftung Deutschland (Foundation for Arts and Culture Germany)

Works in collections 

 :de:Museum im Kleihues-Bau 
 Staatliche Kunsthalle Karlsruhe (State Museum Karlsruhe)
 :de:Städtische Galerie Karlsruhe (Municipal Gallery Karlsruhe)
 :de:Ulmer Museum
 Sammlung (Collection) :de:Schwäbisch Würth
 Sammlung (Collection) Gerhard Hartmann, in the Städtischen Kunstsammlung (municipal art collection) Galerie Albstadt
 Regierungspräsidium (Regional Council) Karlsruhe
 Kernforschungszentrum (Nuclear Research Centre) Karlsruhe
 Handwerkskammer (Chamber of Trades) Karlsruhe
 Bildungsakademie der Handwerkskammer (Academy of Further Education of the Chamber of Trades) Karlsruhe
 Stiftung (Foundation) S-BC-pro arte, Biberach
 Various private collections in Germany, USA, Canada and Switzerland

Public art commissions 
 2004 Redesign of the originally baroque main hall of Palais Bretzenheim Mannheim, reclaiming the original spatial dimensions by taking out a suspended ceiling constructed in the 1950s (Commissioned by Land (State) Baden-Württemberg, Staatl. Vermögensamt (State Finance Office) and Hochbauamt (Public Works Service) Mannheim)
 2004 Design of the front of the courtroom of the Verwaltungsgerichtshof (Higher Administrative Court) Baden-Württemberg in Mannheim (Commissioned by Land Baden-Württemberg, Oberfinanzdirektion (Regional Tax Office) Stuttgart)
 2004 Universität Freiburg (University), Klinikum (Clinical centre); shortlisted

Installations 

Bruno Kurz obtained his first studio on the premises of the IWKA (Industriewerke-Karlsruhe-Augsburg) in Karlsruhe in 1986. With Georg Schalla, he founded the artists' group KUNSTRAUM IWKA and campaigned for the preservation of the huge industrial buildings on the premises. He co-organised a series of exhibitions titled Letzte Arbeitsberichte IWKA I and II, which was vital for saving the building Hallenbau A, now Zentrum für Kunst und Medien, ZKM (Center for Art and Media Karlsruhe).

Yet the artists could not ultimately prevent the destruction of the other buildings and the sale of the estate – in December 1986, the Karlsruhe City Council authorised the premises to be demolished, including the enormous art installations in the industrial buildings. For their gesamtkunstwerk (total work of art) KUNSTRAUM IWKA, the artists group were awarded a project grant by the Kunstfond (Arts Fund) Bonn, which entailed a documentary exhibition in Bonn.

Bruno Kurz created large-scale art installations in his first studio on the IWKA premises. He wanted to generate an adequate counterbalance to the colossal industrial building through large-scale art works and installed huge geometric sculptures of plastic sheeting that reflected the sunlight coming through the sawtooth roof (Installation Kunstraum IWKA, 1987): "Rain water puddles caused by the leaking roof cast back vast reflections and gave the artist further stimuli for his work. In 1988, for the first time, he used water as a sculptural material in space. The clarity of the installations he has since created is a result of these early architectural-monumental experiences of space. Further down the line, he created his spectacular installation 'aller Farben bloß' in the baroque halls of the Ettlinger Schloss (Ettlingen Palace)."

Taking inspiration from the monikers "Green, Blue and Red Salon" and their corresponding tapestries, he installed coloured plastic film in the windows of the halls and created a sequence of coloured light. Notwithstanding the wide range of artistic possibilities offered by three-dimensional space, the formal, aesthetic and conceptual means of his installations clearly relate to his painting practice.

Teaching 
Apart from working as a freelance painter, Bruno Kurz also took on a variety of teaching posts in Higher Education. From 1993 to 1997, he taught Drawing at the Pädagogische Hochschule (University of Education) Karlsruhe, 2002–2008 Painting at the Europäische Kunstakademie (European Academy of Fine Arts) Trier, and 2002–2007 Experimental Painting at the Landesakademie (State Academy Schloss Rotenfels). He is also concerned with art historic analysis and with conveying the practical application of various approaches to painting to lay-persons. Since 1984 he has been part of the team of tutors at the Staatliche Kunsthalle Karlsruhe.

Abstract landscape painting 

Based on the composition of a classic landscape painting, Bruno Kurz creates delicately structured landscapes of colour, which do not reference an actual place any more but depict moods and atmospheres – floating between stillness and energetic dynamism. "The quietness emanating from his works results from their concentration, from their formal and chromatic restraint and the conscious rejection of the spectacular in his pictorial subject matter: landscape and colour space. Despite their discreet harmonies, the works of Bruno Kurz are actual bundles of energy." Emphatically horizontal lines and areas can visually expand beyond the frameless margins of the picture into infinity, and, in conjunction with vertical colour gradients, form a Perpetual motion, effecting a balance of opposite movements – to the point of apparent stillness.

This impression is emphasised through his choice of the square format. Since Kazimir Malevich, the square is considered the absolute form of abstract painting in the 20th century, and, in Bruno Kurz' work, finds its way into landscape painting. It does not become a theme in itself, but lends an almost archaic force to the imaginary horizons and changes in direction of the colour gradients between sky, water and earth. The square creates an unusual section of these colour-landscapes while, at the same time, focussing the permanent oscillation between states of matter.

Energy fields and directions of movement are geometrically fixated and concentrated as in a cross, the symbol of the union of extremes, of synthesis and proportion. It combines time and space. This primeval formal element of art history serves as the subcutaneous base structure in most of Kurz' paintings. It is subliminally discernible in particular geometric components, vertical and horizontal lines, cross-hatching on metal or in brush strokes and enhances the meditative aura of the paintings. Square and cross double the force that originates here, apparently still, yet always in motion: both in the variations of incidence and reflection of light and in the gaze of the beholder. Through the consistent reduction and abstraction of the forms and elements, an unfathomable, almost sacral depth is created. Or as one of his German galleries points out: "Inspired by the classical composition of the countryside, Bruno Kurz produces nuanced, abstract color landscapes of unbelievable illumination and depth."

Colour 

In addition to his strict formal aesthetics, Kurz also examines the physical qualities of his chosen materials. The painter experiments with diverse dyes and paints, merges synthetic elements, pigments, inks, water colour, acrylic and oil paints or resins and fillers in unconventional combinations and layers of colour.
″Horizontal layers provide the colours a clear compositional order.(...) At the same time, their colour space appears to pulsate in fields of light. (Several paintings in this series are named after Lucifer, a deity in Roman myth who personified the Morning Star and whose name means 'Light-Bringer'.) Reflective surfaces – consisting of resin, India ink glazes or transparent silk gauzes layered over a vertically delineated metal background – afford the works a striking luminosity and shimmering colour spectrum.″

The materials are applied in such a way that they keep generating new effects and perplexing visual impressions. The eye of the beholder can immerse itself deeply in these colour landscapes and thereby encounter extreme opposites – from glassy, translucent glazes to relief-like three-dimensional colourstrips.
Beneath the seemingly two-dimensional surface, multiple planes and pigment layers shine through, which evolve through a long process of overpainting and modifying extremely subtle textures. "Kurz's surfaces are richly worked, with paint developed in rich layers. His textural surfaces, inscribed with scumbles, swipes, scrapes, and miasmas of color, capture the rich and varied lands through which he travels in search of beauty.(...) Kurz's bright colors and abstract imagery follow in the tradition of Abstract Expressionist color field painters — such as Mark Rothko and Jan Kolata." The transformation of the conventional canvas painting into a colour space floating in front of the wall is the result of years of engagement with the three core themes Colour – Material – Light.

Material and light 
For Bruno Kurz, painting does not start with paint, but with the choice of the painting surface. He utilises very different materials such as wood, canvas, silk or paper. 
″Through layering as well as the combination of unconventional materials – gauze, sheet metal, resin – the artist accomplishes wild optical impressions. Words such as transparency, levity, and dissolution describe the effect best. (...)The thoroughly reflective resin layers and metallic surfaces create light tricks and reflections that define the atmosphere of the works.″

Over the last few years, the artist has increasingly used sheet metals; in his studio, he prepares and alters their surfaces with grinding machines. Thus, light and colour will later be differently absorbed and reflected. The first horizontal aspects are already generated in the primary material and influence colouring and colour gradients from the outset.

Many titles of his work (e.g. Lichtfänger (Light Catcher) or Translucent Horizons) demonstrate the mindset behind Kurz' oeuvre: navigating the phenomenon of light. The geometric lines of the paint application or the material constitute the basic structure inherent in any new work. Within these lines, Kurz works on the theme of light with always freshly composed and varied arrangements of colour and materials.  "There is no such thing as the right light for my paintings", the painter points out: every incidence of light, every change of the beholder's position effects a new situation, new hues and colour fields emerge – his work appears to change constantly. ″Depending on the incidence of light and position of the viewer, the paintings may be perceived in a variety of ways. The multiple viewpoints offered by the works are the hallmark of their vitality.″

Yet it radiates an unexpected calm, which is the result of optimised formal reduction and concentration. In Kurz' work, light does not visualise anything representational, but, beyond the interplay of colours, indicates the potential for inwardness and a capacity for knowledge. Thus the painter creates the conditions for meditation. His paintings offer vanishing points and spaces of tranquility: "In our hectic world, stillness is the true spectacle."

Catalogues 

 Morgenland II, catalogue of solo exhibition, pub. Kulturgemeinschaft Kressbronn am Bodensee 1992
 Kunst auf Zeit ‒ eine Recherche, pub. Künstlerhaus Berlin 1993. 
 fragments, catalogue of solo exhibition, pub. Wessenberg Galerie des Museums Konstanz and Bruno Kurz 1993
 Viermalfünf Auf Sechsmaldreai, exhibition catalogue of installation with Hubert Kaltenmark, pub. Kunsthalle Prisma, Arbon am Bodensee, Switzerland 1994
 for a blue waterlily, exhibition catalogue of installation at Kunstverein Rastatt, pub. Kunstverein Rastatt 1996
 Mannaz, exhibition catalogue of installation at Kunstraum Artaque, ed. Bruno Kurz 1998
 Bildwechsel 4, exhibition catalogue, pub. Städtische Galerie Karlsruhe 2000. 
 Das Labyrinth oder die Kunst zu Wandeln, ed. Ilse. M. Seifried, with a text by Voré, Haymonverlag (A) 2002. 
 Hebrides, catalogue of solo exhibition, Werkzyklen: BeLiv 1995–1997, Tears of God 1998–2000 und Hebrides 2001/2002, ed. Bruno Kurz, 2003. 
 Bruno Kurz – Indian diary, ein Reisetagebuch, pub. Galerie Epikur, Wuppertal 2003
 -aller Farben bloß-, exhibition catalogue of installation at Schloss Ettlingen, pub. Museum Ettlingen 2003
 Licht Passagen, catalogue of solo exhibition, pub. SüdWestGalerie, Niederalfingen/Aalen 2006. 
 Land auf, Land ab, catalogue of solo exhibition, pub. Kunsthalle Würth, Schwäbisch Hall, Verlag Swiridoff 2004. 
 Malerei des 20. Jahrhunderts, Inventory Staatliche Kunsthalle Karlsruhe, pub. Staatliche Kunsthalle Karlsruhe, ed: Siegmar Holsten, Michael Imhof Verlag, ill. .  (museum edition),  (retail edition)
 TRANSLUCENT, catalogue of solo exhibition, pub. Galerie Fetzer, Sontheim Brenz 2009. 
 99.9% und mehr, Künstler-Gruppenprojekte "vor" dem ZKM, exhibition catalogue, anthology, Author/pub. ZKM/ Peter Weibel (ed.), pages: 28, 37, 46, 47, 49–52, 66, 67, 70. 
 Lichtfänger, catalogue of solo exhibition, pub. Galerie Wesner, Konstanz 2009. 
 Perluceo, catalogue of solo exhibition, pub. Galerie Alfred Knecht, Karlsruhe 2009. 
 Translucent Horizons, catalogue of solo exhibition, pub. Odon Wagner Gallery, Toronto 2012. , National Library of Canada
 Transfigured – The High Bright Night of Bruno Kurz, catalogue of solo exhibition, pub. Odon Wagner Gallery, Toronto 2014. , National Library of Canada
 Begegnungen mit der Ferne, Bilder: Bruno Kurz, Skulpturen: Thomas Reifferscheid, exhibition catalogue pub. Galerie Arthea, Mannheim 2016
 Wasser, Wolken, Wind, Elementar- und Wetterphänomene in Werken der Sammlung Würth, Kunsthalle Würth, Swiridoff Verlag 2016. 
 Integral, The Ambient Paintings of Bruno Kurz, by Donald Brackett, catalogue of solo exhibition, pub. Odon Wagner Gallery, Toronto 2017. , National Library of Canada. Online: https://web.archive.org/web/20170929003502/http://www.odonwagnergallery.com/catalog/index.php?fID=230#page/1
 Bruno Kurz, Wandering The Sublime, by Meghan O'Callaghan, catalogue of solo exhibition, Celebrating 50 Years Odon Wagner Gallery, pub. Odon Wagner Gallery, Toronto 2019. , National Library of Canada. Online: https://web.archive.org/web/20170929003502/http://www.odonwagnergallery.com/catalog/index.php?fID=230#page/1

References

Further reading 

 Petra Kollros: Ahnung von etwas Großartigem. Neue Reisebilder des Karlsruher Malers Bruno Kurz in der Galerie Mock. In: Ulmer Nachrichten, September 1988
 Gerhard Schaugg: Im Spannungsfeld zwischen Tafelbild und Objekt. In: Bodensee-Hefte 10/91
 Christian Hanussek: Begehbare Malerei. Bilder und Objekte von Bruno Kurz. In: Kultur-Blätter, February 13–26, 1993
 Anke Humpeneder: Veränderung und Vergänglichkeit in Fragmenten : Holzdrucke und eine Rauminstallation von Bruno Kurz. In: Landshuter Zeitung/ Feuilleton, March 13, 1995
 Cristina Karlstam: Inom och utom ramarna Installation och maleri. Arbeten av Bruno Kurz. In: Upsala Nya Tidning, Kultur, Schweden, March 23, 1996
 Christiane Lenhardt: Monets "Seerosen" als Symbol für Dualismusprinzip des Seins. In: Badisches Tagblatt, Geistige Welt, March 16, 1996
 H.M.: Marstall wird zum künstlichen Garten umgestaltet. Installationskünstler und Maler Bruno Kurz setzt sein Modell in die Wirklichkeit um. In: Badische Neueste Nachrichten, 14.08.96
 Christiane Lenhardt:  "Seerosen"-Projekt wächst heran. Rauminstallation des Karlsruher Künstlers KURZ entsteht im Marstall. In: Badisches Tagblatt, August 8, 1996
 Michael Hübl: Dunkel lockt das Seherlebnis, Installation von Bruno Kurz. In: Badische Neueste Nachrichten, June 24, 1998
 Author unknown: Von der Aufhebung der Grenzen. Bruno Kurz zeigt die Arbeitszyklen "Hebrides" und "Tears of God" in der Galerie Brötzinger Art. In: Pforzheimer Zeitung, September 10, 2001
 Susanne Marschall: Langsame Bilder im zeitlosen Raum. Die Karlsruher Galerie Alfred Knecht zeigt Arbeiten von Bruno Kurz. In: Badische Neueste Nachrichten, January 18, 2003
 Susanne Marschall: Poetische Träume, sinnliche Farben. Installationen von Bruno Kurz und Adrian Flores im Ettlinger Schloss. In: Badische Neueste Nachrichten, August 17, 2003
 Michael Hübl: Wo die Wahrnehmung ins Schlingern gerät: Der Maler Bruno Kurz und seine Installationen in Spiegelungen. In: Badische Neueste Nachrichten,January 19, 2006
 Wolfgang Nussbaumer: Malerei, die nach Stille strebt. In: Schwäbische Post, Ostalb-Kultur, March 28, 2006
 Author unknown: Licht-Arbeiten von Bruno Kurz. Galerie Alfred Knecht. In: Klappe Auf, Januar 2007
 Ulrike Düwell:Raumtiefe und Transparenz. Bilder und Farbobjekte von Willis Meinhardt und Bruno Kurz in der Freiburger Galerie artopoi.In: Badische Zeitung, March 4, 2008
 Florian Weiland: Können Blumen lügen? Ein Rundgang über die 8. Art Bodensee. In: Südkurier, August 2, 2008
 Marita Kaischke: Ruhe im Quadrat, "Translucent" in der Galerie Fetzer eröffnet. In: Heidenheimer Zeitung May 28, 2009
 Lena Naumann: Abstrakter Impressionist, Zur Malerei von Bruno Kurz , Titelgeschichte in Mundus, Heft 3/2010, München 2010
 Vita von Wedel: Jeder Pinselstrich muß sitzen. In: Frankfurter Allgemeine Sonntagszeitung, Kunstmarkt, S. 53, May 8, 2011
 Joachim Schwitzler: Die Komposition machts. Karlsruher Künstler Bruno Kurz beeindruckt mit seiner Ausstellung in der Galerie Wesner. In: Südkurier, Nr. 239, October 15, 2011
 Bruno Kurz: Ich will keine Inhalte transportieren. In: Rhein-Neckar-Zeitung, December 10, 2013
 Stephen Dillon: Bruno Kurz Turns Stark Icelandic Landscapes into Vibrant Color Field Paintings, Artsy Editorial, October 9, 2014
 Donald Bracket: Verklärung – Die hohe helle Nacht von Bruno Kurz , Text zur Malerei von Bruno Kurz, Vancouver 2014 (Übersetzung Harald Smykla, London 2015)
 Thomas Maschijew: Bruno Kurz – Text für die Galerie Mollwo – Zeitgenössische Kunst, o.J.
 Kirsten Ernst: Wo sich Kunst trifft – auf der art Karlsruhe 2015, April 2, 2015

External links 

 
 Youtube: bruno kurz...and blue amongst clear skies
 Youtube: Bruno Kurz. Light & Colour
  Youtube: Bruno Kurz. Light Chords
 Literature about Bruno Kurz in the catalogue of Staatliche Kunsthalle Karlsruhe
 Visual Arts in Kunstportal Baden-Württemberg: Portrait Bruno Kurz
 Bruno Kurz at Odon Wagner Contemporary, Toronto, Canada

Abstract painters
Contemporary painters
German contemporary artists
20th-century German painters
20th-century German male artists
1957 births
Living people
Artists from Karlsruhe